Dharumapuram Yazhmoorinathar Temple(தருமபுரம் யாழ்மூரிநாதர் கோயில்
]) is a Hindu temple located at Darmapuram in Karaikkal, Pondicherry, India. Now the place is known as Koilpatthu. The presiding deity is Shiva. He is called as Yazh Moori Nathar. His consort is known as Thenamirthavalli.

Significance 

It is one of the shrines of the 275 Paadal Petra Sthalams - Shiva Sthalams glorified in the early medieval Tevaram poems by Tamil Saivite [[Nayanars}Nayanar]] Tirugnanasambandar.

Literary mention 
Tirugnanasambandar describes the feature of the deity as:

References

External links 
 
 

Shiva temples in Puducherry
Padal Petra Stalam